Valdallière is a commune in the department of Calvados, northwestern France. The municipality was established on 1 January 2016 by merger of the 14 former communes of Vassy (the seat), Bernières-le-Patry, Burcy, Chênedollé, Le Désert, Estry, Montchamp, Pierres, Presles, La Rocque, Rully, Saint-Charles-de-Percy, Le Theil-Bocage and Viessoix.

Population

See also 
Communes of the Calvados department

References 

Communes of Calvados (department)
Populated places established in 2016
2016 establishments in France